The Whangaparāoa River is a river in the eastern North Island of New Zealand.

See also
List of rivers of New Zealand

References

Rivers of the Gisborne District
Rivers of New Zealand
Rivers of the Bay of Plenty Region